José Ephim Mindlin (September 8, 1914 – February 28, 2010) was a Brazilian lawyer, businessperson and bibliophile, born to Ukrainian Jewish parents from Odessa.

Life
Son of dentist Ephim Mindlin and of Fanny Mindlin, both born in Odessa, he graduated from the University of São Paulo law school. He worked as a lawyer for 15 years, until he founded with some friends Metal Leve, an automobile piston company, which went on to become a large international player in the automobile parts industry. After years of successful management of the firm as a Director, the opening of the Brazilian markets in the 1990s has reduced Metal Leve's profits, and he and his business associates had to sell the firm in 1996 to German firm Mahle Group.

Mindlin was married to Guita Mindlin, who died in 2006, and they had 4 children and 11 grandchildren.

He was the owner of the largest private library in Latin America, with more than 38,000 titles. A large number (about half) of the collection was donated to the University of São Paulo in May 2006, mostly regarding Brazilian studies. On March 23, 2013 a building was built in the university's campus specifically to maintain this massive library, named after the Guita and José Mindlin Foundation, who made the donation. Mindlin had said he wanted to keep the library alive through the continuous growth of the collection and scientific contributions by academics.

Mindlin and Antônio Ermírio de Moraes were the only two Brazilian businessmen who refused cooperation with Henning Albert Boilesen in the sponsorship of the so-called Operação Bandeirante - a repressive structure to be created to cooperate with the military dictatorship in Brazil. Its main interface with the military regime and the business world was the businessman Henning Albert Boilesen. It is believed that Henning Albert Boilesen was supported by the CIA. The organization was responsible for torture, disappearance and extra judicial killings and kidnappings of numerous Brazilians who opposed the dictatorship.

After retiring from the business world, Mindlin was able to dedicate his time to a passion he had since he was 13: collecting and preserving rare books. The first rare edition in his collection was Discours sur l'Histoire universelle (Speech of Universal History), by Jacques-Bénigne Bossuet, published in 1740.

On 20 June 2006, Mindlin was elected member of the Academia Brasileira de Letras, occupying chair number 29, left open since the death of Brazilian author Josué Montello.

He was also a member of the Vitae Foundation and is the editor of Edusp publishing firm.

Death
He died from a multiple organ failure at the age of 95 on February 28, 2010.

References

External links
  Articles of Incorporation of the Guita and José Mindlin Library
 Vitae Foundation
 Edusp (University of São Paulo Press)
 José Mindlin at the Academia Brasileira de Letras
  Interview with José Mindlin
  Bravo! magazine interview
  100 books recommended by Jose Mindlin
  Isto É magazine

1914 births
2010 deaths
People from São Paulo
Bibliophiles
Brazilian Jews
Members of the Brazilian Academy of Letters
Deaths from multiple organ failure
Brazilian people of Ukrainian-Jewish descent